Phantagram is a video game development studio based in South Korea. It is known for its game series Kingdom Under Fire. Phantagram co-developed the fantasy/strategy action game Ninety-Nine Nights with Q Entertainment, for the Xbox 360. It published Phantom Crash for the Xbox, which was developed by Genki.

History
Phantagram was founded 1994 by a group of teenage students. They have developed video games since 1997, mostly for the popular MSX computer, such as Double Dragon and TDS. In the mid-1990s, the company became the first-generation developers in Korea.

Under their new slogan in 2000, Phantagram released their first game, Kingdom Under Fire: War of Heroes. It became a success worldwide, including in Korea. A series was later created.

Games released
 PC
 Kingdom Under Fire: A War of Heroes
 Blade Warrior
 Forgotten Saga
 Zyclunt
 Shining Lore Online
 Xbox
 Kingdom Under Fire: The Crusaders
 Kingdom Under Fire: Heroes
 Phantom Crash
 Xbox 360
 Ninety-Nine Nights (N3)

External links
 Official website
 Phantagram profile on MobyGames

South Korean companies established in 1994
Video game companies of South Korea
Software companies of South Korea
Video game development companies
Video game companies established in 1994